This suburban area had leaned Progressive Conservative from 1979 until 1993 when it swung hard to the Liberals primarily due to the rapid growth of the Greater Toronto Area and high immigrant populations, just like the suburbs to the north of Toronto. After winning just one seat (Mississauga East) in 1988, the Liberals swept every seat in this region from 1993 to 2006. The new Conservative Party (replacing the Progressive Conservatives) won their first seats in the area in 2008, picking up Oakville and Mississauga—Erindale before sweeping the region when they formed a majority government in 2011. However, the Liberals swept the region in 2015, and again in 2019. In the 2021 Canadian federal election, the Liberals swept the region again, winning all seats with significant margins - allowing them a strong 160 seat minority. 

In 2004, the Liberals won a majority of the vote in every Mississauga and Oakville-based seat, while winning just under 50% in each of the three Brampton-based seats. Their strongest riding was Mississauga East—Cooksville (57%), while their weakest seat was Brampton West (45%). In 2006, the Liberals won a majority of the votes in just three seats, with their strongest seat this time being Mississauga—Brampton South (54%) with their weakest seat being Oakville (43%), which they won by fewer than 800 votes. In 2008, the strongest Liberal seat was again Mississauga East—Cooksville, the only seat in the region where they won a majority of the vote (50%). In 2011 they were shut out of the region, but nearly won Mississauga East—Cooksville, losing it by fewer than 700 votes. In 2015, 2019 and 2021 Canadian federal elections, the Liberals won all ridings in Mississauga, Brampton, and Oakville. 

The Conservatives came within 5 points of winning Brampton West, their best seat in 2004, thanks to star candidate Tony Clement. In 2006, their strongest seat was Oakville, which they nearly won. Oakville remained the Conservatives' best seat in 2008 and 2011. When they swept the region in 2011, Oakville was the only riding where they won a majority of the vote (54%). Thanks to a three-way vote split, the Conservatives still won Bramalea—Gore—Malton with just 34% of the vote.

The NDP has traditionally been very weak in the region. Thanks to a strong candidacy of Jagmeet Singh, the NDP placed second in Bramalea—Gore—Malton in 2011, with 33.5% of the vote, losing the riding by fewer than 600 votes.

2015 - 42nd General Election

2011 - 41st General Election

2008 - 40th General Election

2006 - 39th General Election

2004 - 38th General Election

|-
|bgcolor=whitesmoke|Bramalea—Gore—Malton
||
|Gurbax S. Malhi20,39449.54%
|
|Raminder Gill12,59430.59%
|
|Fernando Miranda6,11314.85%
|
|Sharleen McDowall1,8324.45%
|
|Frank Chilelli (M-L)2370.58%
||
|Gurbax S. Malhi
|-
|bgcolor=whitesmoke|Brampton—Springdale
||
|Ruby Dhalla@19,38547.73%
|
|Sam Hundal111,18227.53%
|
|Kathy Pounder8,03819.79%
|
|Nick Hudson1,9274.74%
|
|Gurdev Singh Mattu (Comm.)860.21%
||
|Sarkis Assadourian†
|-
|bgcolor=whitesmoke|Brampton West
||
|Colleen Beaumier21,25445.30%
|
|Tony Clement18,76840.00%
|
|Chris Moise4,92010.49%
|
|Sanjeev Goel1,6033.42%
|
|Tom Bose (Ind.)3710.79%
||
|Colleen Beaumier
|-
|bgcolor=whitesmoke|Mississauga—Brampton South
||
|Navdeep Bains24,75357.16%
|
|Parvinder Sandhu10,43324.09%
|
|Larry Taylor6,41114.80%
|
|Paul Simas1,5253.52%
|
|David Gershuny (M-L)1850.43%
|colspan=2 align="center"|new district
|-
|rowspan=3 bgcolor=whitesmoke|Mississauga East—Cooksville
|rowspan=3 |
|rowspan=3 |Albina Guarnieri22,43556.70%
|rowspan=3 |
|rowspan=3 |Riina DeFaria10,29926.03%
|rowspan=3 |
|rowspan=3 |Jim Gill4,61911.67%
|rowspan=3 |
|rowspan=3 |Jason Robert Hinchliffe1,1672.95%
|
|Pierre Chénier (M-L)154 0.39%
|rowspan=3 |
|rowspan=3 |Albina Guarnieri
|-
|
|Andrew Seitz (Ind.)114 0.29%
|-
|
|Sally Wong (CHP)778 1.97%
|-
|rowspan=3 bgcolor=whitesmoke|Mississauga—Erindale
|rowspan=3 |
|rowspan=3|Carolyn Parrish28,24654.37%
|rowspan=3|
|rowspan=3|Bob Dechert16,60031.95%
|rowspan=3|
|rowspan=3|Simon Black5,1049.82%
|rowspan=3|
|rowspan=3|Jeff Brownridge1,8553.57%
|rowspan=3|
|rowspan=3|David Greig (M-L)1450.28%
||
|Carolyn Parrish
|-
|colspan=2 align="center"|merged district
|-
||
|Steve Mahoney§
|-
|bgcolor=whitesmoke|Mississauga South
||
|Paul John Mark Szabo24,62851.67%
|
|Phil Green16,02733.62%
|
|Michael James Culkin5,00410.50%
|
|Neeraj Jain1,8993.98%
|
|Dagmar Sullivan (M-L)1070.22%
||
|Paul Szabo
|-
|bgcolor=whitesmoke|Mississauga—Streetsville
||
|Wajid Khan22,76850.56%
|
|Nina Tangri14,28731.73%
|
|Manjinder Rai4,2669.47%
|
|Otto Casanova2,4155.36%
|
|Peter Gibson Creighton (PC)1,2932.87%
|colspan=2 align="center"|new district
|-
|bgcolor=whitesmoke|Oakville
||
|M.A. Bonnie Brown28,72952.01%
|
|Rick Byers19,52435.35%
|
|Alison Myrden4,0277.29%
|
|Tania Orton2,8615.18%
|
|Zeshan Shahbaz (CAP)950.17%
||
|Bonnie Brown
|}

References

Notes

Canadian federal election results in Ontario
Politics of Brampton
Politics of Mississauga
Politics of Oakville, Ontario